Jadhav is an Indian surname. Notable people with the name include:

Bharat Jadhav (born 1973), Indian theatre and film producer
Bhaskar Jadhav, Indian politician
Dhanaji Jadhav (1650–1708), warrior of the Maratha Empire
Kedar Jadhav (born 1985), Indian cricketer
Khashaba Dadasaheb Jadhav (1926–1984), Indian Olympic wrestler
Kulbhushan Jadhav (born 1970), Indian ex-naval officer and businessman, held by Pakistan since 2016 illegally. 
Lakhuji Jadhav, prominent grandee of Sindkhed Raja in 16th century
Loukik Jadhav (born 1989), Indian association footballer
Mary Clubwala Jadhav (1909–1975), Indian philanthropist
Namdeo Jadhav (born 1921), Indian recipient of the Victoria Cross
Narendra Jadhav (born 1953), Indian economist, bureaucrat, writer and educationist
Prataprao Ganpatrao Jadhav (born 1960), member of the Lok Sabha in the Parliament of India
Priyadarshan Jadhav (born 1980), Marathi actor, film director, film producer and screenwriter
Ravi Jadhav, Indian film producer and film director
Sanjay Jadhav, Indian film producer and film director
Sanjay Haribhau Jadhav (born 1967), Indian politician
Siddarth Jadhav (born 1981), Indian actor and comedian
Snehal Jadhav (born 1990), Maharashtrian cricketer
Umesh. G. Jadhav (born 1959), Member of Parliament in the 17th Lok Sabha
Yamini Jadhav, Indian politician

Surnames of Indian origin